was a town located in Takashima District, Shiga Prefecture, Japan. In the Edo period, Ōmizo Domain was based here.

On December 1, 2004, the town had an estimated population of 7,086 and a density of 112.12 persons per km2. The total area was 63.20 km2.

On January 1, 2005, Takashima absorbed the towns of Adogawa, Imazu, Makino and Shin'asahi, and the village of Kutsuki (all from Takashima District) to create the city of Takashima.

Dissolved municipalities of Shiga Prefecture